A parameter is a quantity that changes characteristics of a system or a function.

Parameter may also refer to:

 Parameter (computer programming), special kind of variable
Parameter (linguistics), a grammar rule that is variable across languages
Parameters (journal), a journal of the U.S. Army War College
 In linguistics, see Principles and parameters
 Statistical parameter

See also
 Perimeter